Isle of Capri is a neighbourhood within the suburb of Surfers Paradise in the City of Gold Coast, Queensland, Australia.

History
The area served as a sugar harvest for the nearby Benowa Sugar Mill in the late 1800s and early 1900s before becoming a dairy. In the 1950s, local Italian-Australian Efim Zola began a canal development project which involved raising unused farmland and renamed the area Isle of Capri after Capri island in Italy. Future Gold Coast Mayor Sir Bruce Small overtook the project in 1958 and completed unfinished developments.

As of the early 2000s, the Isle of Capri is considered an affluent neighbourhood of the Gold Coast.

References

Surfers Paradise, Queensland